ModPlug is the name for the series of computer software for creating and playing module files, originally developed by Olivier Lapicque. 
 ModPlug Player, a module player developed in conjunction with the original ModPlug Tracker project and the original ModPlug browser plugin
 ModPlug Tracker, now known as OpenMPT
 LibModplug (decoding engine) public domain software for the OpenSource multimedia framework gStreamer

Software that uses GStreamer